Silke Kraushaar-Pielach (born Silke Kraushaar on 10 October 1970 in Sonneberg, Thuringia) is a German luger who competed from 1995 to 2008. In June 2008, she was named sports manager for the luge section of Bob- und Schlittenverband für Deutschland (BSD - German bobsleigh, luge, and skeleton federation).

Sporting career
Competing in three Winter Olympics, Kraushaar-Pielach won a complete set of medals in the women's singles event with a gold in 1998 (when she beat her team-mate Barbara Niedernhuber by 2 thousandths of a second), a silver in 2006, and a bronze in 2002.

She also won ten medals at the FIL World Luge Championships with four golds (Women's singles: 2004, Mixed team: 2000, 2001, 2007), four silvers (Women's singles: 2000, 2001; Mixed team: 1997, 1999), and two bronze (Women's singles: 2007, 2008).

Kraushaar-Pielach won ten medals at the FIL European Luge Championships, including seven golds (Women's singles: 1998, 2004, 2006; Mixed team: 1998, 2000, 2004, 2006) and three silvers (Women's singles: 2000, 2002, 2008).

She also won the overall Luge World Cup five times (1998-9, 2000-1, 2001-2, 2005-6, 2006-7). Kraushaar-Pielach started her last season off with a win in the women's singles event at Lake Placid, New York on 16 November 2007. Her last race in Sigulda, Latvia on 16 February 2008 saw her finishing third, the same place where she won her first World Cup event on 30 November 1996.

Sports official
In June 2008, Kraushaar-Pielach was named manager of the luge section of the BSD, the German bobsleigh, luge, and skeleton federation.

Personal life
She married German businessman Michael Pielach on 7 July 2006. It was announced on FIL's website on 24 January 2008 that the sled that she had competed with until 1995 had been auctioned on the German version of eBay from 19 to 26 January. Kraushaar-Pielach stated that the proceeds from the auction would be used to benefit young luge. The sled sold for € 1160 and the proceeds went to her sledding club in Oberhof.

References
FIL-Luge August 21, 2006 article on Kraushaar's marriage - accessed November 24, 2007.
FIL-Luge January 24, 2008 article on Kraushaar-Pielach's sled donation on E-Bay. - Accessed January 24, 2008.
FIL-Luge January 31, 2008 article on Kraushaar-Pielach's sled being sold. - Accessed January 31, 2008.
FIL-Luge November 16, 2007 on Kraushaar-Pielach's victory starting her farewell tour.
FIL-Luge.org article on Kraushaar-Pielach's last race in Sigulda, Latvia. - accessed February 16, 2008.
FIL-Luge June 2, 2008 article on Kraushaar-Pielach's transition from athlete to sports official. - accessed June 13, 2008.
FIL-Luge profile

List of European luge champions 

NBC Biography
Official website

External links
 

1970 births
Living people
German female lugers
Olympic lugers of Germany
Olympic gold medalists for Germany
Olympic silver medalists for Germany
Olympic bronze medalists for Germany
Olympic medalists in luge
Lugers at the 1998 Winter Olympics
Lugers at the 2002 Winter Olympics
Lugers at the 2006 Winter Olympics
Medalists at the 1998 Winter Olympics
Medalists at the 2002 Winter Olympics
Medalists at the 2006 Winter Olympics
People from Sonneberg
Sportspeople from Thuringia